The Police Act 1919 (9 & 10 Geo. 5, c.46) was an Act of Parliament of the United Kingdom which set up an alternative dispute resolution system within UK labour law for collective disputes involving members of staff in the police force. The current rules are now found under the Police Act 1996. Following the British police strikes in 1918 and 1919, the government decided that it was a threat to the public to allow strikes among the police force to take place. The Police Act 1919 prohibited police from joining a trade union that could take strike action protected by the Trade Disputes Act 1906, and provided an alternative in the Police Federation of England and Wales. A substitute for strikes was binding arbitration to resolve collective disputes.

See also
United Kingdom labour law
Police Act 1996

United Kingdom labour law
United Kingdom Acts of Parliament 1919
Law enforcement in the United Kingdom
1919 in labor relations
Police legislation in the United Kingdom